The first set of Highland Council wards was first used for Highland Council election purposes in 1995, for the first general election of the council. They were replaced with 80 new wards for the second general election in 1999.

The Highland Council (Comhairle na Gaidhealtachd in  Gaelic) had become a local government authority in 1996, when the two-tier system of regions and districts was abolished and the Highland region became a unitary council area, under the Local Government etc (Scotland) Act 1994. The first Highland Council election, however, was one year earlier, in 1995. Until 1996 councillors shadowed the regional and district councils and planned for the transfer of powers and responsibilities. Elections to the council are normally on a four-year cycle, all wards being contestable at each election.

For the periods 1995 to 1999 each ward elected one councillor by the first past the post system. The first past the post system continued in use when new wards were introduced in 1999, but the increased number of wards meant an increase in the number of councillors.

The wards used from 1995 to 1999 were subdivisions of eight council management areas, with councillors elected from each area forming an area committee. The wards created in 1999, however, were not exactly subdivisions of the management areas, management area boundaries were not adjusted to take account of new ward boundaries and, therefore, area committees ceased to be exactly representative of areas for which they were named and for which they took decisions.

Lists of wards, 1995 to 1999 

Wards are listed by management area, and are numbered as well as named.

Badenoch and Strathspey wards 
The Badenoch and Strathspey management area consisted of five wards:

Caithness wards 
The Caithness management area consisted of eight wards:

Inverness wards 
The Inverness management area included Loch Ness, Strathglass and the town of Inverness.

The management area consisted of 20 wards:

Lochaber wards 
The Lochaber management area consisted of eight wards:

Nairn wards 

The Nairn management area included the town of Nairn but was mostly rural.
It consisted of five wards:

Ross and Cromarty wards 
The Ross and Cromarty management area consisted of 13 wards:

Skye and Lochalsh wards 

The Skye and Lochalsh management area included the islands of Skye, Raasay and Scalpay, the village of Kyle of Lochalsh on the mainland, and a rural area to the east of Kyle of Lochalsh. It consisted of six wards:

Sutherland wards 
The Sutherland management area consisted of seven wards:

See also
Politics of the Highland council area

Notes and references 

Highland council wards
Lists of wards in Scotland